The UnitedHealthcare US Open Racquetball Championships is the premier professional racquetball event. It is a Grand Slam event with men and women competing from the International Racquetball Tour and Ladies Professional Racquetball Tour, respectively. Beginning in 2014, the US Open added a pro doubles division.  The US Open also has divisions for amateur players, and hundreds of people participate each year. Overall, there were 708 participants in 2021, and 732 participants in 2019.

The 2021 UnitedHealthcare US Open was October 6–10 in Minneapolis, Minnesota, which was the 11th year since the event began in 1996 that it was in the Twin Cities. United Health Care was the title sponsor for the ninth consecutive year.

The first 14 years the tournament were held in Memphis, Tennessee.  Hosted by USA Racquetball the US Open was held in mid-November for the first 12 years, but in 2008 the event was moved up a month to October.

Doug Ganim, a multiple racquetball World Champion in Men's Doubles and former pro player on the International Racquetball Tour, was the US Open's Tournament Director for its first 25 years, but he retired from the position in 2021.

Men's pro competition

Men's champions

US Open Men's Finalists by wins and losses

Men career records

This table lists all players who have been US Open semi-finalists with their result for each year they competed. Note: W = winner, F = finalist, SF = semi-finalist, QF = quarterfinalist, 16 = Round of 16, 32 = Round of 32, 64 = Round of 64, 128 = Round of 128.

Women's pro competition

Women's Champions

US Open Women's finalists by wins and losses

Women career records

This table lists all players who have been US Open semi-finalists with their result for each year they competed. Note: W = winner, F = finalist, SF = semi-finalist, QF = quarterfinalist, 16 = Round of 16, 32 = Round of 32, 64 = Round of 64, 128 = Round of 128.

References

External links
 United Health Care US Open Racquetball Championship site 
 IRT Historical Data Archive

Racquetball competitions
Racquetball in the United States